The Allemanskraal Dam is a dam in the Free State province of  South Africa, on the Sand River. It was established in 1960.

The dam is completely surrounded by, and forms part of the Willem Pretorius Game Reserve.

See also
List of reservoirs and dams in South Africa
List of rivers in South Africa

References 

 List of South African Dams from the Department of Water Affairs

Dams in South Africa
Dams completed in 1960